The Commonwealth Centre Party was a minor Australian political party that contested the 1961 federal election. It was formed by disaffected members of the Liberal Party. It had little success and was wound up soon after the election.

References

Defunct political parties in Australia
Political parties with year of establishment missing
Political parties with year of disestablishment missing